Konstantinos Gkelaouzos is a Greek long-distance runner. He was born on 21 November 1990 in Amfissa and resides in Athens. 
His personal best in the Marathon run (2:14:15) places him in the fifth place among all time Greek Marathon runners.

On 14 November 2021, with a time of 2:16:49 during the 2021 Athens Classic Marathon, he set the record for the fastest Greek runner of all time that has run the classic route.

Competition record

References

1990 births
Living people
Greek male long-distance runners
Panathinaikos Athletics
Greek male cross country runners
Greek male marathon runners
Athletes (track and field) at the 2018 Mediterranean Games
Mediterranean Games competitors for Greece
People from Amfissa
Sportspeople from Central Greece
21st-century Greek people